The following is an overview of the events of 2014 in film, including the highest-grossing films, award ceremonies, festivals, and a list of films released and notable deaths. DreamWorks Animation celebrated its 20th anniversary in 2014.

Evaluation of the year
In his article highlighting the best films of 2014, Richard Brody of The New Yorker stated, "The great surge in American filmmaking in the past ten years is due to independent financing at all levels. The American independent cinema is right now the flower of the world, but independence isn't in itself a merit badge. Artistically, the films in question range from the majestic to the meretricious. Independent financing has set truly imaginative directors into free flight. This is a moment of extraordinary cinematic invention—of filmmakers, working at a wide range of budget levels, coming up with original and personal ideas about movies and how to make them. On the other hand, this independent surge has also created a new class of culturally respectable directors and films, an ostensible art cinema that flows into the mainstream. True independent filmmaking has always been a tough proposition in the marketplace, let alone at the multiplex. Its commercial obstacles are an increasing problem even for established professionals, who now take their place alongside street-level independents. Filmmakers rightly worry that it's becoming more difficult than ever to make a salable movie, to make a living making movies. If films are becoming like books, where the artistically ambitious ones are only rarely big hits, then directors working outside Hollywood will become more and more like novelists, who often need to supplement their income with teaching or other outside jobs. As independent films become increasingly marginalized in the marketplace, this loss of status risks marginalizing critics as well—which is why the re-professionalization of the movie business has become a matter of critical advocacy."

Highest-grossing films 

The top 10 films released in 2014 by worldwide gross are as follows:
{| class="wikitable sortable" style="margin:auto; margin:auto;"
|+Highest-grossing films of 2014
!Rank
!Title
!Distributor
!Worldwide gross
|-
! style="text-align:center;"| 1
|Transformers: Age of Extinction
|Paramount
|$1,104,054,072
|-
! style="text-align:center;"| 2
|The Hobbit: The Battle of the Five Armies
|Warner Bros. / MGM
|$962,200,000
|-
! style="text-align:center;"| 3
|Guardians of the Galaxy
| rowspan="2" |Disney
|$773,350,147
|-
! style="text-align:center;"| 4
|Maleficent
|$758,410,378
|-
! style="text-align:center;"| 5
|The Hunger Games: Mockingjay – Part 1
|Lionsgate
|$755,356,711
|-
! style="text-align:center;"| 6
|X-Men: Days of Future Past
|Fox
|$746,045,700
|-
! style="text-align:center;"| 7
|Captain America: The Winter Soldier
|Disney
|$714,421,503
|-
! style="text-align:center;"| 8
|Dawn of the Planet of the Apes
|Fox
|$710,644,566
|-
! style="text-align:center;"| 9
|The Amazing Spider-Man 2
|Sony Pictures / Columbia
|$708,982,323
|-
! style="text-align:center;"| 10
|Interstellar
|Paramount / Warner Bros.
|$701,463,813
|}

Box office records
Transformers: Age of Extinction grossed more than $1.1 billion, becoming the 10th highest-grossing film of all time.
 PK became the first Indian movie to gross more than $100 million at the box office
2014 was also the first year since 1997 in which there were no animated movies among the 10 highest-grossing films of the year.

Events

Award ceremonies

Festivals

Awards

2014 films 
The list of films released in 2014, arranged by country, are as follows:
 List of American films of 2014
 List of Argentine films of 2014
 List of Australian films of 2014
 List of Bangladeshi films of 2014
 List of Brazilian films of 2014
 List of British films of 2014
 List of French films of 2014
 List of Hong Kong films of 2014
 List of Indian films of 2014
 List of Assamese films of 2014
 List of Bengali films of 2014
 List of Bollywood films of 2014
 List of Punjabi films of 2014
 List of Gujarati films
 List of Kannada films of 2014
 List of Malayalam films of 2014
 List of Marathi films of 2014
 List of Tamil films of 2014
 List of Telugu films of 2014
 List of Tulu films of 2014
 List of Indonesian films
 List of Italian films of 2014
 List of Japanese films of 2014
 List of Mexican films of 2014
 List of Pakistani films of 2014
 List of Russian films of 2014
 List of South Korean films of 2014
 List of Spanish films of 2014
 List of Turkish films of 2014

Deaths

{| class="wikitable sortable" style="font-size:90%;"
|- style="background:#dae3e7; text-align:center;"
! Month !! Date !! Name !! Age !! Nationality !! Profession !! Notable films !! 
|- valign="top"
! rowspan=40 style="text-align:center; vertical-align:top;"| January
| style="text-align:center;"| 1 || Billy McColl || style="text-align:center;"| 62 || style="text-align:center;"| Scottish-English || style="text-align:center;"| Actor || 
|-
| style="text-align:center;"| 1 || Juanita Moore || style="text-align:center;"| 99 || style="text-align:center;"| American || style="text-align:center;"| Actress || 
|-
| style="text-align:center;"| 2 || Bernard Glasser || style="text-align:center;"| 89 || style="text-align:center;"| American || style="text-align:center;"| Director, Producer || 
|-
| style="text-align:center;"| 3 || Saul Zaentz || style="text-align:center;"| 92 || style="text-align:center;"| American || style="text-align:center;"| Producer || 
|-
| style="text-align:center;"| 5 || Tom Quinn || style="text-align:center;"| 79 || style="text-align:center;"| American || style="text-align:center;"| Actor || 
|-
| style="text-align:center;"| 5 || Carmen Zapata || style="text-align:center;"| 86 || style="text-align:center;"| American || style="text-align:center;"| Actress || 
|-
| style="text-align:center;"| 6 || Larry D. Mann || style="text-align:center;"| 91 || style="text-align:center;"| Canadian-American || style="text-align:center;"| Actor || 
|-
| style="text-align:center;"| 11 || Jophery Brown || style="text-align:center;"| 68 || style="text-align:center;"| American || style="text-align:center;"| Actor, Stuntman || 
|-
| style="text-align:center;"| 11 || Arnoldo Foà || style="text-align:center;"| 97 || style="text-align:center;"| Italian || style="text-align:center;"| Actor || 
|-
| style="text-align:center;"| 11 || Jerome Willis || style="text-align:center;"| 85 || style="text-align:center;"| English || style="text-align:center;"| Actor || 
|-
| style="text-align:center;"| 12 || Alexandra Bastedo || style="text-align:center;"| 67 || style="text-align:center;"| English || style="text-align:center;"| Actress || 
|-
| style="text-align:center;"| 12 || John Horsley || style="text-align:center;"| 93 || style="text-align:center;"| English || style="text-align:center;"| Actor || 
|-
| style="text-align:center;"| 12 || Frank Marth || style="text-align:center;"| 91 || style="text-align:center;"| American || style="text-align:center;"| Actor || 
|-
| style="text-align:center;"| 14 || Dick Shepherd || style="text-align:center;"| 86 || style="text-align:center;"| American || style="text-align:center;"| Producer|| 
|-
| style="text-align:center;"| 15 || Roger Lloyd-Pack || style="text-align:center;"| 69 || style="text-align:center;"| English || style="text-align:center;"| Actor || 
|-
| style="text-align:center;"| 15 || Stanford Tischler || style="text-align:center;"| 92 || style="text-align:center;"| American || style="text-align:center;"| Editor, Producer || 
|-
| style="text-align:center;"| 16 || Harvey Bernhard || style="text-align:center;"| 89 || style="text-align:center;"| American || style="text-align:center;"| Screenwriter, Producer || 
|-
| style="text-align:center;"| 16 || Ruth Duccini || style="text-align:center;"| 95 || style="text-align:center;"| American || style="text-align:center;"| Actress || 
|-
| style="text-align:center;"| 16 || Russell Johnson || style="text-align:center;"| 89 || style="text-align:center;"| American || style="text-align:center;"| Actor || 
|-
| style="text-align:center;"| 16 || Dave Madden || style="text-align:center;"| 82 || style="text-align:center;"| Canadian-American || style="text-align:center;"| Actor || 
|-
| style="text-align:center;"| 16 || Hal Sutherland || style="text-align:center;"| 84 || style="text-align:center;"| American || style="text-align:center;"| Animator, Director || 
|-
| style="text-align:center;"| 18 || Sarah Marshall || style="text-align:center;"| 80 || style="text-align:center;"| English-American || style="text-align:center;"| Actress || 
|-
| style="text-align:center;"| 19 || Gordon Hessler || style="text-align:center;"| 88 || style="text-align:center;"| German-English || style="text-align:center;"| Director, Producer || 
|-
| style="text-align:center;"| 19 || Ben Starr || style="text-align:center;"| 92 || style="text-align:center;"| American || style="text-align:center;"| Screenwriter || 
|-
| style="text-align:center;"| 20 || James Jacks || style="text-align:center;"| 66 || style="text-align:center;"| American || style="text-align:center;"| Producer || 
|-
| style="text-align:center;"| 22 || Luis Ávalos || style="text-align:center;"| 67 || style="text-align:center;"| Cuban-American || style="text-align:center;"| Actor || 
|-
| style="text-align:center;"| 22 || Martin S. Bergmann || style="text-align:center;"| 100 || style="text-align:center;"| American || style="text-align:center;"| Actor || 
|-
| style="text-align:center;"| 22 || Pierre Jalbert || style="text-align:center;"| 89 || style="text-align:center;"| Canadian-American || style="text-align:center;"| Actor, Editor || 
|-
| style="text-align:center;"| 22 || Carlo Mazzacurati || style="text-align:center;"| 57 || style="text-align:center;"| Italian || style="text-align:center;"| Director, Screenwriter || 
|-
| style="text-align:center;"| 23 || Riz Ortolani || style="text-align:center;"| 87 || style="text-align:center;"| Italian || style="text-align:center;"| Composer, Conductor || 
|-
| style="text-align:center;"| 24 || Lisa Daniely || style="text-align:center;"| 84 || style="text-align:center;"| English || style="text-align:center;"| Actress || 
|-
| style="text-align:center;"| 26 || Margery Mason || style="text-align:center;"| 100 || style="text-align:center;"| English || style="text-align:center;"| Actress || 
|-
| style="text-align:center;"| 27 || Ann Carter || style="text-align:center;"| 77 || style="text-align:center;"| American || style="text-align:center;"| Actress || 
|-
| style="text-align:center;"| 28 || John Cacavas || style="text-align:center;"| 83 || style="text-align:center;"| American || style="text-align:center;"| Composer || 
|-
| style="text-align:center;"| 29 || Aïché Nana || style="text-align:center;"| 77 || style="text-align:center;"| Lebanese-Italian || style="text-align:center;"| Actress || 
|-
| style="text-align:center;"| 30 || Campbell Lane || style="text-align:center;"| 78 || style="text-align:center;"| Canadian || style="text-align:center;"| Actor || 
|-
| style="text-align:center;"| 30 || William Motzing || style="text-align:center;"| 76 || style="text-align:center;"| American || style="text-align:center;"| Composer, Conductor || 
|-
| style="text-align:center;"| 30 || Arthur Rankin Jr. || style="text-align:center;"| 89 || style="text-align:center;"| American || style="text-align:center;"| Director, Producer || 
|-
| style="text-align:center;"| 31 || Miklós Jancsó || style="text-align:center;"| 92 || style="text-align:center;"| Hungarian || style="text-align:center;"| Director, Screenwriter || 
|-
| style="text-align:center;"| 31 || Christopher Jones || style="text-align:center;"| 72 || style="text-align:center;"| American || style="text-align:center;"| Actor || 
|-
! rowspan=23 style="text-align:center; vertical-align:top;"| February
| style="text-align:center;"| 1 || Maximilian Schell || style="text-align:center;"| 83 ||style="text-align:center;"| Austrian-Swiss || style="text-align:center;"| Actor || 
|-
| style="text-align:center;"| 2 || Philip Seymour Hoffman || style="text-align:center;"| 46 ||style="text-align:center;"| American || style="text-align:center;"| Actor, Director || 
|-
| style="text-align:center;"| 2 || Craig Lahiff || style="text-align:center;"| 66 ||style="text-align:center;"| Australian || style="text-align:center;"| Director, Producer || 
|-
| style="text-align:center;"| 3 || Richard Bull || style="text-align:center;"| 89 ||style="text-align:center;"| American || style="text-align:center;"| Actor || 
|-
| style="text-align:center;"| 3 || Louan Gideon || style="text-align:center;"| 58 ||style="text-align:center;"| American || style="text-align:center;"| Actress || 
|-
| style="text-align:center;"| 9 || Gabriel Axel || style="text-align:center;"| 95 ||style="text-align:center;"| Danish || style="text-align:center;"| Director, Screenwriter || 
|-
| style="text-align:center;"| 9 || Eric Bercovici || style="text-align:center;"| 80 ||style="text-align:center;"| American || style="text-align:center;"| Screenwriter, Producer || 
|-
| style="text-align:center;"| 10 || Ronnie Masterson || style="text-align:center;"| 87 ||style="text-align:center;"| Irish || style="text-align:center;"| Actress || 
|-
| style="text-align:center;"| 10 || Shirley Temple || style="text-align:center;"| 85 ||style="text-align:center;"| American || style="text-align:center;"| Actress, Singer || 
|-
| style="text-align:center;"| 12 || Sid Caesar || style="text-align:center;"| 91 ||style="text-align:center;"| American || style="text-align:center;"| Actor || 
|-
| style="text-align:center;"| 13 || Ken Jones || style="text-align:center;"| 83 ||style="text-align:center;"| English || style="text-align:center;"| Actor || 
|-
| style="text-align:center;"| 13 || Ralph Waite || style="text-align:center;"| 85 ||style="text-align:center;"| American || style="text-align:center;"| Actor || 
|-
| style="text-align:center;"| 14 || Remo Capitani || style="text-align:center;"| 86 ||style="text-align:center;"| Italian || style="text-align:center;"| Actor || 
|-
| style="text-align:center;"| 14 || James Condon || style="text-align:center;"| 90 ||style="text-align:center;"| Australian || style="text-align:center;"| Actor || 
|-
| style="text-align:center;"| 14 || Robert M. Fresco || style="text-align:center;"| 83 ||style="text-align:center;"| American || style="text-align:center;"| Screenwriter || 
|-
| style="text-align:center;"| 14 || John Henson || style="text-align:center;"| 48 ||style="text-align:center;"| American || style="text-align:center;"| Actor, Puppeteer || 
|-
| style="text-align:center;"| 15 || Mary Grace Canfield || style="text-align:center;"| 89 ||style="text-align:center;"| American || style="text-align:center;"| Actress || 
|-
| style="text-align:center;"| 15 || Christopher Malcolm || style="text-align:center;"| 67 ||style="text-align:center;"| Scottish || style="text-align:center;"| Actor || 
|-
| style="text-align:center;"| 16 || Jimmy T. Murakami || style="text-align:center;"| 80 ||style="text-align:center;"| American || style="text-align:center;"| Animator, Director || 
|-
| style="text-align:center;"| 18 || Malcolm Tierney || style="text-align:center;"| 75 ||style="text-align:center;"| English || style="text-align:center;"| Actor || 
|-
| style="text-align:center;"| 20 || Roger Hill || style="text-align:center;"| 65 ||style="text-align:center;"| American || style="text-align:center;"| Actor || 
|-
| style="text-align:center;"| 24 || Harold Ramis || style="text-align:center;"| 69 ||style="text-align:center;"| American || style="text-align:center;"| Actor, Director, Producer, Screenwriter || 
|-
| style="text-align:center;"| 25 || Jim Lange || style="text-align:center;"| 81 ||style="text-align:center;"| American || style="text-align:center;"| Actor || 
|-
! rowspan=24 style="text-align:center; vertical-align:top;"| March
| style="text-align:center;"| 1 || Alain Resnais || style="text-align:center;"| 91 ||style="text-align:center;"| French || style="text-align:center;"| Director, Screenwriter || 
|-
| style="text-align:center;"| 2 || Gail Gilmore || style="text-align:center;"| 76 ||style="text-align:center;"| Canadian-American || style="text-align:center;"| Actress, Dancer || 
|-
| style="text-align:center;"| 2 || Stanley Rubin || style="text-align:center;"| 96 ||style="text-align:center;"| American || style="text-align:center;"| Producer, Screenwriter || 
|-
| style="text-align:center;"| 3 || Curtis McClarin || style="text-align:center;"| 44 ||style="text-align:center;"| American || style="text-align:center;"| Actor || 
|-
| style="text-align:center;"| 5 || Geoff Edwards || style="text-align:center;"| 83 ||style="text-align:center;"| American || style="text-align:center;"| Actor || 
|-
| style="text-align:center;"| 5 || Scott Kalvert || style="text-align:center;"| 49 ||style="text-align:center;"| American || style="text-align:center;"| Director || 
|-
| style="text-align:center;"| 6 || Sheila MacRae || style="text-align:center;"| 93 ||style="text-align:center;"| English-American || style="text-align:center;"| Actress || 
|-
| style="text-align:center;"| 7 || Hal Douglas || style="text-align:center;"| 89 ||style="text-align:center;"| American || style="text-align:center;"| Actor || 
|-
| style="text-align:center;"| 8 || James Ellis || style="text-align:center;"| 82 ||style="text-align:center;"| Irish-English || style="text-align:center;"| Actor || 
|-
| style="text-align:center;"| 8 || Wendy Hughes || style="text-align:center;"| 61 ||style="text-align:center;"| Australian || style="text-align:center;"| Actress, Producer || 
|-
| style="text-align:center;"| 10 || Patricia Laffan || style="text-align:center;"| 94 || style="text-align:center;"| English || style="text-align:center;"| Actress || 
|-
| style="text-align:center;"| 12 || Richard Coogan || style="text-align:center;"| 99 ||style="text-align:center;"| American || style="text-align:center;"| Actor || 
|-
| style="text-align:center;"| 12 || Med Flory || style="text-align:center;"| 87 ||style="text-align:center;"| American || style="text-align:center;"| Actor || 
|-
| style="text-align:center;"| 13 || Abby Singer || style="text-align:center;"| 96 ||style="text-align:center;"| American || style="text-align:center;"| Production Manager || 
|-
| style="text-align:center;"| 17 || Oswald Morris || style="text-align:center;"| 98 ||style="text-align:center;"| English || style="text-align:center;"| Cinematographer || 
|-
| style="text-align:center;"| 18 || Joe Lala || style="text-align:center;"| 66 ||style="text-align:center;"| American || style="text-align:center;"| Actor || 
|-
| style="text-align:center;"| 21 || James Rebhorn || style="text-align:center;"| 65 ||style="text-align:center;"| American || style="text-align:center;"| Actor || 
|-
| style="text-align:center;"| 22 || Patrice Wymore || style="text-align:center;"| 87 ||style="text-align:center;"| American || style="text-align:center;"| Actress, Singer || 
|-
| style="text-align:center;"| 25 || Eddie Lawrence || style="text-align:center;"| 95 ||style="text-align:center;"| American || style="text-align:center;"| Actor || 
|-
| style="text-align:center;"| 26 || George Bookasta || style="text-align:center;"| 96 ||style="text-align:center;"| American || style="text-align:center;"| Actor || 
|-
| style="text-align:center;"| 28 || Lorenzo Semple Jr. || style="text-align:center;"| 91 ||style="text-align:center;"| American || style="text-align:center;"| Screenwriter || 
|-
| style="text-align:center;"| 29 || Marc Platt || style="text-align:center;"| 100 ||style="text-align:center;"| American || style="text-align:center;"| Actor, Singer, Dancer || 
|-
| style="text-align:center;"| 30 || Kate O'Mara || style="text-align:center;"| 74 ||style="text-align:center;"| English || style="text-align:center;"| Actress || 
|-
| style="text-align:center;"| 31 || David Hannay || style="text-align:center;"| 75 ||style="text-align:center;"| Australian || style="text-align:center;"| Producer || 
|-
! rowspan=17 style="text-align:center; vertical-align:top;"| April
| style="text-align:center;"| 2 || Richard Brick || style="text-align:center;"| 68 ||style="text-align:center;"| American || style="text-align:center;"|Producer, Production Manager || 
|-
| style="text-align:center;"| 2 || Everett De Roche || style="text-align:center;"| 67 ||style="text-align:center;"| American-Australian || style="text-align:center;"| Screenwriter, Actor || 
|-
| style="text-align:center;"| 3 || Paul Salamunovich || style="text-align:center;"| 86 ||style="text-align:center;"| American || style="text-align:center;"| Conductor || 
|-
| style="text-align:center;"| 5 || John Pinette || style="text-align:center;"| 50 ||style="text-align:center;"| American || style="text-align:center;"| Actor || 
|-
| style="text-align:center;"| 6 || Mary Anderson || style="text-align:center;"| 96 ||style="text-align:center;"| American || style="text-align:center;"| Actress || 
|-
| style="text-align:center;"| 6 || Mickey Rooney || style="text-align:center;"| 93 ||style="text-align:center;"| American || style="text-align:center;"| Actor, Singer, Producer || 
|-
| style="text-align:center;"| 7 || Perlita Neilson || style="text-align:center;"| 80 ||style="text-align:center;"| English || style="text-align:center;"| Actress || 
|-
| style="text-align:center;"| 9 || Gil Askey || style="text-align:center;"| 89 ||style="text-align:center;"| American-Australian || style="text-align:center;"| Composer || 
|-
| style="text-align:center;"|10|| Phyllis Frelich || style=2text-align:center;| 70 ||style="text-align:center;"| American || style="text-align:center;"| Actress || 
|-
| style="text-align:center;"|11|| Edna Doré || style=2text-align:center;| 92 ||style="text-align:center;"| English || style="text-align:center;"| Actress || 
|-
| style="text-align:center;"|11|| Darrell Zwerling || style=2text-align:center;| 85 ||style="text-align:center;"| American || style="text-align:center;"| Actor || 
|-
| style="text-align:center;"|14|| Ingeborg von Kusserow || style=2text-align:center;| 95 ||style="text-align:center;"| German-English || style="text-align:center;"| Actress || 
|-
| style="text-align:center;"|17|| Anthony Marriott || style=2text-align:center;| 83 ||style="text-align:center;"| English || style="text-align:center;"| Screenwriter || 
|-
| style="text-align:center;"|21|| Craig Hill || style=2text-align:center;| 88 ||style="text-align:center;"| American-Spanish || style="text-align:center;"| Actor || 
|-
| style="text-align:center;"|26|| Antonio Pica || style=2text-align:center;| 81 ||style="text-align:center;"| Spanish || style="text-align:center;"| Actor || 
|-
| style="text-align:center;"|29|| Bob Hoskins || style=2text-align:center;| 71 ||style="text-align:center;"| English || style="text-align:center;"| Actor, Director || 
|-
| style="text-align:center;"|30|| Judi Meredith || style=2text-align:center;| 77 ||style="text-align:center;"| American || style="text-align:center;"| Actress || 
|-
! rowspan=33 style="text-align:center; vertical-align:top;"| May
| style="text-align:center;"| 1 || Assi Dayan || style="text-align:center;"| 68 ||style="text-align:center;"| Israeli || style="text-align:center;"| Actor || 
|-
| style="text-align:center;"| 1 || Howard Smith || style="text-align:center;"| 77 ||style="text-align:center;"| American || style="text-align:center;"| Actor, Director, Producer || 
|-
| style="text-align:center;"| 1 || Eli Woods || style="text-align:center;"| 91 ||style="text-align:center;"| English || style="text-align:center;"| Actor || 
|-
| style="text-align:center;"| 2 || Pauline Wagner || style="text-align:center;"| 103 ||style="text-align:center;"| American || style="text-align:center;"| Actress || 
|-
| style="text-align:center;"| 2 || Efrem Zimbalist, Jr. || style="text-align:center;"| 95 ||style="text-align:center;"| American || style="text-align:center;"| Actor, Voice Actor || 
|-
| style="text-align:center;"| 3 || Leslie Carlson || style="text-align:center;"| 81 ||style="text-align:center;"| American-Canadian || style="text-align:center;"| Actor || 
|-
| style="text-align:center;"| 5 || Jackie Lynn Taylor || style="text-align:center;"| 87 ||style="text-align:center;"| American || style="text-align:center;"| Actress || 
|-
| style="text-align:center;"| 6 || Virginia Belmont || style="text-align:center;"| 92 ||style="text-align:center;"| American || style="text-align:center;"| Actress || 
|-
| style="text-align:center;"| 6 || Antony Hopkins || style="text-align:center;"| 93 ||style="text-align:center;"| English || style="text-align:center;"| Composer, Conductor || 
|-
| style="text-align:center;"| 6 || William Olvis || style="text-align:center;"| 56 ||style="text-align:center;"| American || style="text-align:center;"| Composer || 
|-
| style="text-align:center;"| 7 || Tony Genaro || style="text-align:center;"| 72 ||style="text-align:center;"| American || style="text-align:center;"| Actor || 
|-
| style="text-align:center;"| 8 || Beverly Long || style="text-align:center;"| 81 ||style="text-align:center;"| American || style="text-align:center;"| Actress || 
|-
| style="text-align:center;"| 8 || Nancy Malone || style="text-align:center;"| 79 ||style="text-align:center;"| American || style="text-align:center;"| Actress || 
|-
| style="text-align:center;"| 11 || Barbara Knudson || style="text-align:center;"| 86 ||style="text-align:center;"| American || style="text-align:center;"| Actress || 
|-
| style="text-align:center;"| 12 || Cornell Borchers || style="text-align:center;"| 89 ||style="text-align:center;"| Lithuanian-German || style="text-align:center;"| Actress || 
|-
| style="text-align:center;"| 12 || H. R. Giger || style="text-align:center;"| 74 ||style="text-align:center;"| Swiss || style="text-align:center;"| Visual Effects || 
|-
| style="text-align:center;"| 12 || Ralph Peduto || style="text-align:center;"| 72 ||style="text-align:center;"| American || style="text-align:center;"| Actor || 
|-
| style="text-align:center;"| 18 || Jerry Vale || style="text-align:center;"| 83 ||style="text-align:center;"| American || style="text-align:center;"| Singer  || 
|-
| style="text-align:center;"| 18 || Gordon Willis || style="text-align:center;"| 82 ||style="text-align:center;"| American || style="text-align:center;"| Cinematographer || 
|-
| style="text-align:center;"| 19 || Peter Curtin || style="text-align:center;"| 70 ||style="text-align:center;"| Australian || style="text-align:center;"| Actor || 
|-
| style="text-align:center;"| 20 || Barbara Murray || style="text-align:center;"| 84 ||style="text-align:center;"| English || style="text-align:center;"| Actress || 
|-
| style="text-align:center;"| 21 || Poni Adams || style="text-align:center;"| 95 ||style="text-align:center;"| American || style="text-align:center;"| Actress || 
|-
| style="text-align:center;"| 22 || Matthew Cowles || style="text-align:center;"| 69 ||style="text-align:center;"| American || style="text-align:center;"| Actor || 
|-
| style="text-align:center;"| 23 || Mona Freeman || style="text-align:center;"| 87 ||style="text-align:center;"| American || style="text-align:center;"| Actress || 
|-
| style="text-align:center;"| 23 || Michael Gottlieb || style="text-align:center;"| 69 ||style="text-align:center;"| American || style="text-align:center;"| Director, Screenwriter || 
|-
| style="text-align:center;"| 25 || Lee Chamberlin || style="text-align:center;"| 76 ||style="text-align:center;"| American || style="text-align:center;"| Actress || 
|-
| style="text-align:center;"| 25 || Herb Jeffries || style="text-align:center;"| 100 ||style="text-align:center;"| American || style="text-align:center;"| Actor, Singer || 
|-
| style="text-align:center;"| 25 || Bunny Yeager || style="text-align:center;"| 85 ||style="text-align:center;"| American || style="text-align:center;"| Actress || 
|-
| style="text-align:center;"| 26 || Anna Berger || style="text-align:center;"| 91 ||style="text-align:center;"| American || style="text-align:center;"| Actress || 
|-
| style="text-align:center;"| 28 || Maya Angelou || style="text-align:center;"| 86 ||style="text-align:center;"| American || style="text-align:center;"| Actress || 
|-
| style="text-align:center;"| 29 || Karlheinz Böhm || style="text-align:center;"| 86 ||style="text-align:center;"| German-Austrian || style="text-align:center;"| Actor || 
|-
| style="text-align:center;"| 30 || Joan Lorring || style="text-align:center;"| 88 ||style="text-align:center;"| Hong Kong-American || style="text-align:center;"| Actress || 
|-
| style="text-align:center;"| 31 || Martha Hyer || style="text-align:center;"| 89 ||style="text-align:center;"| American || style="text-align:center;"| Actress || 
|-
! rowspan=30 style="text-align:center; vertical-align:top;"| June
| style="text-align:center;"| 1 || Ann B. Davis || style="text-align:center;"| 88 ||style="text-align:center;"| American || style="text-align:center;"| Actress || 
|-
| style="text-align:center;"| 1 || Joseph Olita || style="text-align:center;"| 70 ||style="text-align:center;"| Kenyan || style="text-align:center;"| Actor || 
|-
| style="text-align:center;"| 4 || Neal Arden || style="text-align:center;"| 104 ||style="text-align:center;"| English || style="text-align:center;"| Actor || 
|-
| style="text-align:center;"| 4 || Cliff Severn || style="text-align:center;"| 88 ||style="text-align:center;"| English-American || style="text-align:center;"| Actor || 
|-
| style="text-align:center;"| 7 || Jacques Herlin || style="text-align:center;"| 86 ||style="text-align:center;"| French || style="text-align:center;"| Actor || 
|-
| style="text-align:center;"| 8 || Veronica Lazăr || style="text-align:center;"| 75 ||style="text-align:center;"| Romanian-Italian || style="text-align:center;"| Actress || 
|-
| style="text-align:center;"| 9 || Rik Mayall || style="text-align:center;"| 56 ||style="text-align:center;"| English || style="text-align:center;"| Actor || 
|-
| style="text-align:center;"| 11 || Ruby Dee || style="text-align:center;"| 91 ||style="text-align:center;"| American || style="text-align:center;"| Actress || 
|-
| style="text-align:center;"| 11 || Gilles Ségal || style="text-align:center;"| 82 ||style="text-align:center;"| Romanian-French || style="text-align:center;"| Actor || 
|-
| style="text-align:center;"| 12 || Carla Laemmle || style="text-align:center;"| 104 ||style="text-align:center;"| American || style="text-align:center;"| Actress || 
|-
| style="text-align:center;"| 12 || Jimmy Scott || style="text-align:center;"| 88 ||style="text-align:center;"| American || style="text-align:center;"| Actor, Singer || 
|-
| style="text-align:center;"| 14 || Isabelle Collin Dufresne || style="text-align:center;"| 78 ||style="text-align:center;"| French-American || style="text-align:center;"| Actress || 
|-
| style="text-align:center;"| 14 || Sam Kelly || style="text-align:center;"| 70 ||style="text-align:center;"| English || style="text-align:center;"| Actor || 
|-
| style="text-align:center;"| 14 || Francis Matthews || style="text-align:center;"| 86 ||style="text-align:center;"| English || style="text-align:center;"| Actor || 
|-
| style="text-align:center;"| 14 || Terry Richards || style="text-align:center;"| 81 ||style="text-align:center;"| English || style="text-align:center;"| Actor, Stuntman || 
|-
| style="text-align:center;"| 15 || Jacques Bergerac || style="text-align:center;"| 87 ||style="text-align:center;"| French || style="text-align:center;"| Actor || 
|-
| style="text-align:center;"| 15 || Casey Kasem || style="text-align:center;"| 82 ||style="text-align:center;"| American || style="text-align:center;"| Actor || 
|-
| style="text-align:center;"| 17 || Patsy Byrne || style="text-align:center;"| 80 ||style="text-align:center;"| English || style="text-align:center;"| Actress || 
|-
| style="text-align:center;"| 17 || Barry Moss || style="text-align:center;"| 74 ||style="text-align:center;"| American || style="text-align:center;"| Casting Director || 
|-
| style="text-align:center;"| 17 || Jeffry Wickham || style="text-align:center;"| 80 ||style="text-align:center;"| English || style="text-align:center;"| Actor || 
|-
| style="text-align:center;"| 18 || James Nelson || style="text-align:center;"| 81 ||style="text-align:center;"| American || style="text-align:center;"| Sound Editor || 
|-
| style="text-align:center;"| 22 || Steve Rossi || style="text-align:center;"| 82 ||style="text-align:center;"| American || style="text-align:center;"| Actor || 
|-
| style="text-align:center;"| 24 || Eli Wallach || style="text-align:center;"| 98 ||style="text-align:center;"| American || style="text-align:center;"| Actor, Producer || 
|-
| style="text-align:center;"| 26 || Wolf Koenig || style="text-align:center;"| 86 ||style="text-align:center;"| German-Canadian || style="text-align:center;"| Director, Producer || 
|-
| style="text-align:center;"| 26 || Mary Rodgers || style="text-align:center;"| 83 ||style="text-align:center;"| American || style="text-align:center;"| Screenwriter || 
|-
| style="text-align:center;"| 27 || Bobby Womack || style="text-align:center;"| 70 ||style="text-align:center;"| American || style="text-align:center;"| Actor, Composer || 
|-
| style="text-align:center;"| 28 || Meshach Taylor || style="text-align:center;"| 67 ||style="text-align:center;"| American || style="text-align:center;"| Actor || 
|-
| style="text-align:center;"| 29 || Dermot Healy || style="text-align:center;"| 66 ||style="text-align:center;"| Irish || style="text-align:center;"| Actor || 
|-
| style="text-align:center;"| 30 || Bob Hastings || style="text-align:center;"| 89 ||style="text-align:center;"| American || style="text-align:center;"| Actor || 
|-
| style="text-align:center;"| 30 || Paul Mazursky || style="text-align:center;"| 84 ||style="text-align:center;"| American || style="text-align:center;"| Actor, Director, Screenwriter || 
|-
! rowspan=25 style="text-align:center; vertical-align:top;"| July
| style="text-align:center;"| 4 || Paul Apted || style="text-align:center;"| 47 ||style="text-align:center;"| English-American || style="text-align:center;"| Sound Editor || 
|-
| style="text-align:center;"| 5 || Noel Black || style="text-align:center;"| 77 ||style="text-align:center;"| American || style="text-align:center;"| Director, Producer || 
|-
| style="text-align:center;"| 5 || Rosemary Murphy || style="text-align:center;"| 89 ||style="text-align:center;"| German-American || style="text-align:center;"| Actress, Singer || 
|-
| style="text-align:center;"| 6 || Dave Bickers || style="text-align:center;"| 76 ||style="text-align:center;"| English || style="text-align:center;"| Stuntman || 
|-
| style="text-align:center;"| 6 || Dave Legeno || style="text-align:center;"| 50 ||style="text-align:center;"| English || style="text-align:center;"| Actor || 
|-
| style="text-align:center;"| 7 || Dick Jones || style="text-align:center;"| 87 ||style="text-align:center;"| American || style="text-align:center;"| Actor, Singer || 
|-
| style="text-align:center;"| 9 || Ken Thorne || style="text-align:center;"| 90 ||style="text-align:center;"| English-American || style="text-align:center;"| Composer || 
|-
| style="text-align:center;"| 10 || Zohra Sehgal || style="text-align:center;"| 102 ||style="text-align:center;"| Indian || style="text-align:center;"| Actress, Dancer || 
|-
| style="text-align:center;"| 11 || Ray Lonnen || style="text-align:center;"| 74 ||style="text-align:center;"| English || style="text-align:center;"| Actor || 
|-
| style="text-align:center;"| 14 || Tom Rolf || style="text-align:center;"| 82 ||style="text-align:center;"| Swedish-American || style="text-align:center;"| Film Editor || 
|-
| style="text-align:center;"| 16 || Hans Funck || style="text-align:center;"| 61 ||style="text-align:center;"| German || style="text-align:center;"| Film Editor || 
|-
| style="text-align:center;"| 17 || Elaine Stritch || style="text-align:center;"| 89 ||style="text-align:center;"| American || style="text-align:center;"| Actress || 
|-
| style="text-align:center;"| 17 || John Walton || style="text-align:center;"| 62 ||style="text-align:center;"| Australian || style="text-align:center;"| Actor || 
|-
| style="text-align:center;"| 18 || Dietmar Schönherr || style="text-align:center;"| 88 ||style="text-align:center;"| Austrian-Spanish || style="text-align:center;"| Actor || 
|-
| style="text-align:center;"| 19 || John Fasano || style="text-align:center;"| 52 || style="text-align:center;"| American || style="text-align:center;"| Screenwriter, Producer || 
|-
| style="text-align:center;"| 19 || James Garner || style="text-align:center;"| 86 || style="text-align:center;"| American || style="text-align:center;"| Actor || 
|-
| style="text-align:center;"| 19 || Skye McCole Bartusiak || style="text-align:center;"| 21 || style="text-align:center;"| American || style="text-align:center;"| Actress || 
|-
| style="text-align:center;"| 19 || Peter Marquardt || style="text-align:center;"| 50 || style="text-align:center;"| American || style="text-align:center;"| Actor || 
|-
| style="text-align:center;"| 20 || Álex Angulo || style="text-align:center;"| 61 || style="text-align:center;"| Spanish || style="text-align:center;"| Actor ||  || align = "center" | 
|-
| style="text-align:center;"| 23 || Dora Bryan || style="text-align:center;"| 91 || style="text-align:center;"| English || style="text-align:center;"| Actress || 
|-
| style="text-align:center;"| 24 || Walt Martin || style="text-align:center;"| 69 || style="text-align:center;"| American || style="text-align:center;"| Sound Mixer || 
|-
| style="text-align:center;"| 28 || James Shigeta || style="text-align:center;"| 85 || style="text-align:center;"| American || style="text-align:center;"| Actor, Singer || 
|-
| style="text-align:center;"| 30 || Dennis Lipscomb || style="text-align:center;"| 72 || style="text-align:center;"| American || style="text-align:center;"| Actor || 
|-
| style="text-align:center;"| 30 || Dick Smith || style="text-align:center;"| 92 || style="text-align:center;"| American || style="text-align:center;"| Make-up Artist || 
|-
| style="text-align:center;"| 31 || Kenny Ireland || style="text-align:center;"| 68 || style="text-align:center;"| Scottish || style="text-align:center;"| Actor || 
|-
! rowspan=20 style="text-align:center; vertical-align:top;"| August
| style="text-align:center;"| 5 || Marilyn Burns || style="text-align:center;"| 65 || style="text-align:center;"| American || style="text-align:center;"| Actress || 
|-
| style="text-align:center;"| 8 || Menahem Golan || style="text-align:center;"| 85 || style="text-align:center;"| Israeli || style="text-align:center;"| Director, Producer, Screenwriter || 
|-
| style="text-align:center;"| 8 || Charles Keating || style="text-align:center;"| 72 || style="text-align:center;"| English-American || style="text-align:center;"| Actor || 
|-
| style="text-align:center;"| 8 || Danny Murphy || style="text-align:center;"| 58 || style="text-align:center;"| American || style="text-align:center;"| Actor || 
|-
| style="text-align:center;"| 8 || J. J. Murphy || style="text-align:center;"| 85 || style="text-align:center;"| Irish || style="text-align:center;"| Actor || 
|-
| style="text-align:center;"| 8 || Peter Sculthorpe || style="text-align:center;"| 85 || style="text-align:center;"| Australian || style="text-align:center;"| Composer || 
|-
| style="text-align:center;"| 9 || J. E. Freeman || style="text-align:center;"| 68 || style="text-align:center;"| American || style="text-align:center;"| Actor || 
|-
| style="text-align:center;"| 9 || Ed Nelson || style="text-align:center;"| 85 || style="text-align:center;"| American || style="text-align:center;"| Actor || 
|-
| style="text-align:center;"| 11 || Joe Viskocil || style="text-align:center;"| 61 || style="text-align:center;"| American || style="text-align:center;"| Visual Effects || 
|-
| style="text-align:center;"| 11 || Robin Williams || style="text-align:center;"| 63 || style="text-align:center;"| American || style="text-align:center;"| Actor, Producer, Comedian || 
|-
| style="text-align:center;"| 12 || Lauren Bacall || style="text-align:center;"| 89 || style="text-align:center;"| American || style="text-align:center;"| Actress || 
|-
| style="text-align:center;"| 12 || Arlene Martel || style="text-align:center;"| 78 || style="text-align:center;"| American || style="text-align:center;"| Actress, Singer || 
|-
| style="text-align:center;"| 13 || Columba Domínguez || style="text-align:center;"| 85 || style="text-align:center;"| Mexican || style="text-align:center;"| Actress || 
|-
| style="text-align:center;"| 14 || Stephen Lee || style="text-align:center;"| 58 || style="text-align:center;"| American || style="text-align:center;"| Actor || 
|-
| style="text-align:center;"| 18 || Don Pardo || style="text-align:center;"| 96 || style="text-align:center;"| American || style="text-align:center;"| Actor || 
|-
| style="text-align:center;"| 18 || Tom Pevsner || style="text-align:center;"| 87 || style="text-align:center;"| German-English || style="text-align:center;"| Producer, Production Manager || 
|-
| style="text-align:center;"| 19 || Brian G. Hutton || style="text-align:center;"| 79 || style="text-align:center;"| American || style="text-align:center;"| Actor, Director || 
|-
| style="text-align:center;"| 24 || Richard Attenborough || style="text-align:center;"| 90 || style="text-align:center;"| English || style="text-align:center;"| Actor, Director, Producer || 
|-
| style="text-align:center;"| 25 || William Greaves || style="text-align:center;"| 87 || style="text-align:center;"| American || style="text-align:center;"| Actor, Director, Producer || 
|-
| style="text-align:center;"| 28 || Bill Kerr || style="text-align:center;"| 92 || style="text-align:center;"| South African-Australian|| style="text-align:center;"| Actor || 
|-
| style="text-align:center;"| 30 || Andrew V. McLaglen || style="text-align:center;"| 94 || style="text-align:center;"| English-American || style="text-align:center;"| Director, Producer || 
|-
! rowspan=25 style="text-align:center; vertical-align:top;"| September
| style="text-align:center;"| 1 || Gottfried John || style="text-align:center;"| 72 ||style="text-align:center;"| German || style="text-align:center;"| Actor || 
|-
| style="text-align:center;"| 4 || Joan Rivers || style="text-align:center;"| 81 ||style="text-align:center;"| American || style="text-align:center;"| Actress, Director, Voice Actress || 
|-
| style="text-align:center;"| 5 || Karel Černý || style="text-align:center;"| 92 ||style="text-align:center;"| Czech || style="text-align:center;"| Production Designer || 
|-
| style="text-align:center;"| 6 || Stefan Gierasch || style="text-align:center;"| 88 ||style="text-align:center;"| American || style="text-align:center;"| Actor || 
|-
| style="text-align:center;"| 7 || Don Keefer || style="text-align:center;"| 98 ||style="text-align:center;"| American || style="text-align:center;"| Actor || 
|-
| style="text-align:center;"| 7 || Yoshiko Ōtaka || style="text-align:center;"| 94 ||style="text-align:center;"| Chinese-Japanese || style="text-align:center;"| Actress, Singer || 
|-
| style="text-align:center;"| 9 || Howell Evans || style="text-align:center;"| 86 ||style="text-align:center;"| Welsh || style="text-align:center;"| Actor || 
|-
| style="text-align:center;"| 9 || Denny Miller || style="text-align:center;"| 80 ||style="text-align:center;"| American || style="text-align:center;"| Actor || 
|-
| style="text-align:center;"| 10 || Richard Kiel || style="text-align:center;"| 74 ||style="text-align:center;"| American || style="text-align:center;"| Actor || 
|-
| style="text-align:center;"| 11 || Joachim Fuchsberger || style="text-align:center;"| 87 ||style="text-align:center;"| German || style="text-align:center;"| Actor || 
|-
| style="text-align:center;"| 11 || Donald Sinden || style="text-align:center;"| 90 ||style="text-align:center;"| English || style="text-align:center;"| Actor || 
|-
| style="text-align:center;"| 12 || John Bardon || style="text-align:center;"| 75 ||style="text-align:center;"| English || style="text-align:center;"| Actor || 
|-
| style="text-align:center;"| 12 || Theodore J. Flicker || style="text-align:center;"| 84 ||style="text-align:center;"| American || style="text-align:center;"| Director, Screenwriter || 
|-
| style="text-align:center;"| 14 || Assheton Gorton || style="text-align:center;"| 84 ||style="text-align:center;"| English-Welsh || style="text-align:center;"| Production Designer || 
|-
| style="text-align:center;"| 14 || Angus Lennie || style="text-align:center;"| 84 ||style="text-align:center;"| Scottish-English || style="text-align:center;"| Actor || 
|-
| style="text-align:center;"| 19 || Peggy Drake || style="text-align:center;"| 91 ||style="text-align:center;"| Austrian-American || style="text-align:center;"| Actress || 
|-
| style="text-align:center;"| 19 || Audrey Long || style="text-align:center;"| 92 ||style="text-align:center;"| American || style="text-align:center;"| Actress || 
|-
| style="text-align:center;"| 20 || Polly Bergen || style="text-align:center;"| 84 ||style="text-align:center;"| American || style="text-align:center;"| Actress, Singer || 
|-
| style="text-align:center;"| 20 || George Sluizer || style="text-align:center;"| 82 ||style="text-align:center;"| French-Dutch || style="text-align:center;"| Director, Producer, Screenwriter || 
|-
| style="text-align:center;"| 22 || Skip E. Lowe || style="text-align:center;"| 85 ||style="text-align:center;"| American || style="text-align:center;"| Actor || 
|-
| style="text-align:center;"| 26 || Jim Boeke || style="text-align:center;"| 76 ||style="text-align:center;"| American || style="text-align:center;"| Actor || 
|-
| style="text-align:center;"| 26 || Sam Hall || style="text-align:center;"| 93 ||style="text-align:center;"| American || style="text-align:center;"| Screenwriter || 
|-
| style="text-align:center;"| 26 || Michael McCarty || style="text-align:center;"| 68 ||style="text-align:center;"| American || style="text-align:center;"| Actor || 
|-
| style="text-align:center;"| 27 || Sarah Danielle Madison || style="text-align:center;"| 40 ||style="text-align:center;"| American || style="text-align:center;"| Actress || 
|-
| style="text-align:center;"| 30 || Ralph Cosham || style="text-align:center;"| 78 ||style="text-align:center;"| English-American || style="text-align:center;"| Actor || 
|-
! rowspan=30 style="text-align:center; vertical-align:top;"| October
| style="text-align:center;"| 2 || Carlos Lopez || style="text-align:center;"| 25 ||style="text-align:center;"| American || style="text-align:center;"| Actor, Stuntman || 
|-
| style="text-align:center;"| 4 || Michael Goldberg || style="text-align:center;"| 55 ||style="text-align:center;"| American || style="text-align:center;"| Screenwriter || 
|-
| style="text-align:center;"| 4 || John J. Lloyd || style="text-align:center;"| 92 ||style="text-align:center;"| American || style="text-align:center;"| Production Designer || 
|-
| style="text-align:center;"| 5 || Anna Maria Gherardi || style="text-align:center;"| 74 ||style="text-align:center;"| Italian || style="text-align:center;"| Actress || 
|-
| style="text-align:center;"| 5 || Geoffrey Holder || style="text-align:center;"| 84 ||style="text-align:center;"| Trinidadian-American || style="text-align:center;"| Actor, Singer || 
|-
| style="text-align:center;"| 5 || Ike Jones || style="text-align:center;"| 84 ||style="text-align:center;"| American || style="text-align:center;"| Actor, Producer || 
|-
| style="text-align:center;"| 5 || Misty Upham || style="text-align:center;"| 32 ||style="text-align:center;"| American || style="text-align:center;"| Actress || 
|-
| style="text-align:center;"| 6 || Marian Seldes || style="text-align:center;"| 86 ||style="text-align:center;"| American || style="text-align:center;"| Actress || 
|-
| style="text-align:center;"| 7 || Federico Boido || style="text-align:center;"| 75 ||style="text-align:center;"| Italian || style="text-align:center;"| Actor || 
|-
| style="text-align:center;"| 9 || Jan Hooks || style="text-align:center;"| 57 ||style="text-align:center;"| American || style="text-align:center;"| Actress || 
|-
| style="text-align:center;"| 9 || Kim Koscki || style="text-align:center;"| 50 ||style="text-align:center;"| American || style="text-align:center;"| Actor, Stuntman || 
|-
| style="text-align:center;"| 9 || Victor Winding || style="text-align:center;"| 85 ||style="text-align:center;"| English-Welsh || style="text-align:center;"| Actor || 
|-
| style="text-align:center;"| 10 || Pavel Landovský || style="text-align:center;"| 78 ||style="text-align:center;"| Czech || style="text-align:center;"| Actor || 
|-
| style="text-align:center;"| 11 || Gary McLarty || style="text-align:center;"| 73 ||style="text-align:center;"| American || style="text-align:center;"| Actor, Stuntman || 
|-
| style="text-align:center;"| 11 || Bob Orrison || style="text-align:center;"| 86 ||style="text-align:center;"| American || style="text-align:center;"| Actor, Stuntman || 
|-
| style="text-align:center;"| 13 || Elizabeth Norment || style="text-align:center;"| 61 ||style="text-align:center;"| American || style="text-align:center;"| Actress || 
|-
| style="text-align:center;"| 14 || Elizabeth Peña || style="text-align:center;"| 55 ||style="text-align:center;"| American || style="text-align:center;"| Actress || 
|-
| style="text-align:center;"| 15 || Marie Dubois || style="text-align:center;"| 77 ||style="text-align:center;"| French || style="text-align:center;"| Actress || 
|-
| style="text-align:center;"| 16 || Sumi Haru || style="text-align:center;"| 75 ||style="text-align:center;"| American || style="text-align:center;"| Actress || 
|-
| style="text-align:center;"| 19 || Lynda Bellingham || style="text-align:center;"| 66 ||style="text-align:center;"| Canadian-English || style="text-align:center;"| Actress || 
|-
| style="text-align:center;"| 19 || Edward Donno || style="text-align:center;"| 79 ||style="text-align:center;"| American || style="text-align:center;"| Actor, Stuntman || 
|-
| style="text-align:center;"| 19 || Gerard Parkes || style="text-align:center;"| 90 ||style="text-align:center;"| Irish-Canadian || style="text-align:center;"| Actor || 
|-
| style="text-align:center;"| 20 || Ox Baker || style="text-align:center;"| 80 ||style="text-align:center;"| American || style="text-align:center;"| Actor || 
|-
| style="text-align:center;"| 20 || L. M. Kit Carson || style="text-align:center;"| 73 ||style="text-align:center;"| American || style="text-align:center;"| Actor, Producer, Screenwriter || 
|-
| style="text-align:center;"| 24 || Ted Beniades || style="text-align:center;"| 91 ||style="text-align:center;"| American || style="text-align:center;"| Actor || 
|-
| style="text-align:center;"| 24 || Marcia Strassman || style="text-align:center;"| 66 ||style="text-align:center;"| American || style="text-align:center;"| Actress, Singer || 
|-
| style="text-align:center;"| 26 || Françoise Bertin || style="text-align:center;"| 89 ||style="text-align:center;"| French || style="text-align:center;"| Actress || 
|-
| style="text-align:center;"| 26 || Michael Hawkins || style="text-align:center;"| 85 ||style="text-align:center;"| English || style="text-align:center;"| Actor || 
|-
| style="text-align:center;"| 30 || Renée Asherson || style="text-align:center;"| 99 ||style="text-align:center;"| English || style="text-align:center;"| Actress || 
|-
| style="text-align:center;"| 31 || Ian Fraser || style="text-align:center;"| 81 ||style="text-align:center;"| English-American || style="text-align:center;"| Composer, Conductor || 
|-
! rowspan=16 style="text-align:center; vertical-align:top;"| November
| style="text-align:center;"| 1 || Donald Saddler || style="text-align:center;"| 94 ||style="text-align:center;"| American || style="text-align:center;"| Choreographer || 
|-
| style="text-align:center;"| 4 || Richard Schaal || style="text-align:center;"| 86 ||style="text-align:center;"| American || style="text-align:center;"| Actor || 
|-
| style="text-align:center;"| 6 || Carole Matthews || style="text-align:center;"| 94 || style="text-align:center;"| American || style="text-align:center;"| Actress || 
|-
| style="text-align:center;"| 7 || Zoltán Gera || style="text-align:center;"| 91 ||style="text-align:center;"| Hungarian || style="text-align:center;"| Actor || 
|-
| style="text-align:center;"| 10 || Steve Dodd || style="text-align:center;"| 86 ||style="text-align:center;"| Australian || style="text-align:center;"| Actor || 
|-
| style="text-align:center;"| 10 || Ernest Kinoy || style="text-align:center;"| 89 ||style="text-align:center;"| American || style="text-align:center;"| Screenwriter || 
|-
| style="text-align:center;"| 10 || Ken Takakura || style="text-align:center;"| 83 ||style="text-align:center;"| Japanese || style="text-align:center;"| Actor || 
|-
| style="text-align:center;"| 11 || Carol Ann Susi || style="text-align:center;"| 62 ||style="text-align:center;"| American || style="text-align:center;"| Actress || 
|-
| style="text-align:center;"| 12 || Buddy Catlett || style="text-align:center;"| 81 ||style="text-align:center;"| American || style="text-align:center;"| Actor || 
|-
| style="text-align:center;"| 12 || Warren Clarke || style="text-align:center;"| 67 ||style="text-align:center;"| English || style="text-align:center;"| Actor || 
|-
| style="text-align:center;"| 12 || Richard Pasco || style="text-align:center;"| 88 ||style="text-align:center;"| English || style="text-align:center;"| Actor || 
|-
| style="text-align:center;"| 16 || Charles Champlin || style="text-align:center;"| 88 ||style="text-align:center;"| American || style="text-align:center;"| Critic, Actor || 
|-
| style="text-align:center;"| 19 || Mike Nichols || style="text-align:center;"| 83 ||style="text-align:center;"| German-American || style="text-align:center;"| Director, Producer, Screenwriter || 
|-
| style="text-align:center;"| 22 || Derek Deadman || style="text-align:center;"| 74 ||style="text-align:center;"| English || style="text-align:center;"| Actor || 
|-
| style="text-align:center;"| 25 || Joanna Dunham || style="text-align:center;"| 78 ||style="text-align:center;"| English || style="text-align:center;"| Actress || 
|-
| style="text-align:center;"| 27 || Frank Yablans || style="text-align:center;"| 79 ||style="text-align:center;"| American || style="text-align:center;"| Screenwriter, Producer || 
|-
! rowspan=29 style="text-align:center; vertical-align:top;"| December
| style="text-align:center;"| 2 || Gerry Fisher || style="text-align:center;"| 88 ||style="text-align:center;"| English || style="text-align:center;"| Cinematographer || 
|-
| style="text-align:center;"| 2 || Jeff Truman || style="text-align:center;"| 57 ||style="text-align:center;"| Australian || style="text-align:center;"| Actor || 
|-
| style="text-align:center;"| 5 || Yashaw Adem || style="text-align:center;"| ?? ||style="text-align:center;"| Turkish || style="text-align:center;"| Actor || 
|-
| style="text-align:center;"| 5 || Manuel De Sica || style="text-align:center;"| 65 ||style="text-align:center;"| Italian || style="text-align:center;"| Composer || 
|-
| style="text-align:center;"| 7 || Eddie Rouse || style="text-align:center;"| 60 ||style="text-align:center;"| American || style="text-align:center;"| Actor || 
|-
| style="text-align:center;"| 9 || Mary Ann Mobley || style="text-align:center;"| 75 ||style="text-align:center;"| American || style="text-align:center;"| Actress || 
|-
| style="text-align:center;"| 11 || Tom Adams || style="text-align:center;"| 76 ||style="text-align:center;"| English || style="text-align:center;"| Actor || 
|-
| style="text-align:center;"| 15 || Booth Colman || style="text-align:center;"| 91 ||style="text-align:center;"| American || style="text-align:center;"| Actor || 
|-
| style="text-align:center;"| 18 || Virna Lisi || style="text-align:center;"| 78 ||style="text-align:center;"| Italian || style="text-align:center;"| Actress || 
|-
| style="text-align:center;"| 18 || Mandy Rice-Davies || style="text-align:center;"| 70 ||style="text-align:center;"| Welsh-English || style="text-align:center;"| Actress || 
|-
| style="text-align:center;"| 19 || Arthur Gardner || style="text-align:center;"| 104 ||style="text-align:center;"| American || style="text-align:center;"| Actor, Producer || 
|-
| style="text-align:center;"| 20 || Gino Pellegrini || style="text-align:center;"| 73 ||style="text-align:center;"| Italian-American || style="text-align:center;"| Set Designer || 
|-
| style="text-align:center;"| 21 || Billie Whitelaw || style="text-align:center;"| 82 ||style="text-align:center;"| English || style="text-align:center;"| Actress || 
|-
| style="text-align:center;"| 22 || Christine Cavanaugh || style="text-align:center;"| 51 ||style="text-align:center;"| American || style="text-align:center;"| Actress || 
|-
| style="text-align:center;"| 22 || Richard Graydon || style="text-align:center;"| 92 ||style="text-align:center;"| English || style="text-align:center;"| Actor, Stuntman || 
|-
| style="text-align:center;"| 22 || Joseph Sargent || style="text-align:center;"| 89 ||style="text-align:center;"| American || style="text-align:center;"| Director, Producer || 
|-
| style="text-align:center;"| 23 || Mike Elliott || style="text-align:center;"| 68 ||style="text-align:center;"| English || style="text-align:center;"| Actor || 
|-
| style="text-align:center;"| 23 || Jeremy Lloyd || style="text-align:center;"| 84 ||style="text-align:center;"| English || style="text-align:center;"| Actor, Screenwriter || 
|-
| style="text-align:center;"| 24 || Buddy DeFranco || style="text-align:center;"| 91 ||style="text-align:center;"| American || style="text-align:center;"| Actor || 
|-
| style="text-align:center;"| 25 || Dave Comer || style="text-align:center;"| 59 ||style="text-align:center;"| New Zealand || style="text-align:center;"| Location Scout || 
|-
| style="text-align:center;"| 25 || David Ryall || style="text-align:center;"| 79 ||style="text-align:center;"| English || style="text-align:center;"| Actor || 
|-
| style="text-align:center;"| 25 || Bernard Kay || style="text-align:center;"| 86 ||style="text-align:center;"| English || style="text-align:center;"| Actor || 
|-
| style="text-align:center;"| 26 || Rhodes Reason || style="text-align:center;"| 84 ||style="text-align:center;"| American || style="text-align:center;"| Actor || 
|-
| style="text-align:center;"| 27 || Bridget Turner || style="text-align:center;"| 75 ||style="text-align:center;"| English || style="text-align:center;"| Actress || 
|-
| style="text-align:center;"| 28 || Frankie Randall || style="text-align:center;"| 76 ||style="text-align:center;"| American || style="text-align:center;"| Actor, Singer || 
|-
| style="text-align:center;"| 30 || Yolande Donlan || style="text-align:center;"| 94 ||style="text-align:center;"| American-English || style="text-align:center;"| Actress || 
|-
| style="text-align:center;"| 30 || Patrick Gowers || style="text-align:center;"| 78 ||style="text-align:center;"| English || style="text-align:center;"| Composer || 
|-
| style="text-align:center;"| 30 || Luise Rainer || style="text-align:center;"| 104 ||style="text-align:center;"| German-English || style="text-align:center;"| Actress || 
|-
| style="text-align:center;"| 31 || Edward Herrmann || style="text-align:center;"| 71 ||style="text-align:center;"| American || style="text-align:center;"| Actor || 
|}

Film debuts
Danielle Brooks - Time Out of MindDean-Charles Chapman - Before I Go to SleepAnders Holm - NeighborsJanelle Monáe - Rio 2Artemis Pebdani - Sex TapeFlorence Pugh - The Falling''

References

 
Film by year